On 31 March 2017, a car bombing took place at a market in Parachinar, northwest Pakistan. The bombing was believed to be motivated by sectarianism, as the majority of the area's residents are Shia Muslims. At least 24 people were killed and more than 70 injured as a result of the blast. Prime Minister Nawaz Sharif and other political leaders condemned the attack.

See also
January 2017 Parachinar bombing

References 

2017 murders in Pakistan
Explosions in 2017
21st-century mass murder in Pakistan
Mass murder in 2017
Terrorist incidents in Pakistan in 2017
March 2017 crimes in Asia
March 2017
Marketplace attacks in Asia